Juste Chevillet (1729–1802) was a French engraver. He is known for his engravings for the Histoire Naturelle of Georges-Louis Leclerc, Comte de Buffon.

Life

Juste Chevillet was born in 1729 in Frankfurt an der Oder.
He studied engraving in Berlin under George Frederic Schmidt.
He then moved to Paris to complete his studies with Johann Georg Wille, who became his brother-in-law.
He probably reached Paris no earlier than 1750.
The Livre de Principes de Fleurs, an undated compilation of engravings of flowers by Chevillet after drawings by Louis Tessier was probably published some time after 1755.
It was used as a source of decorations for the marquetry of Jean Henri Riesener (1734–1896).
Other cabinet makers used the engravings for marquetry including Jean-Pierre Latz, Jean-François Oeben, Roger Vandercruse Lacroix, Abraham Roentgen (1711–93) and his son David Roentgen (1743-1807).
The earliest dated example of such marquetry is a 1769 roll-top desk for King Louis XV of France by Riesener and Oeben.

Chevillet made an engraving of an oil painting of Benjamin Franklin by Joseph Duplessis that was used on a two-dollar note issued around 1828 by the Chemical Bank of New York City.
The engraving was made in 1778 from the original owned by Jacques-Donatien Le Ray de Chaumont, who had hosted Franklin at the Hôtel Valentinois in Passy.
He made an engraving of George Washington after a design by Michel Honoré Bounieu.
Chevillet was living in Paris in 1795.
He died in Paris around 1800 or 1802.

Selected works
Other works by Chevillet include:
Chardin (Jean-Baptiste-Simeon), French painter (1771). Bust after a self-portrait
Diderot (Denis). Bust after a drawing by Bounieu of a bust by M. Houdon
Louis-Philippe, duc d'Orleans. bust drawn and engraved by Chevillet.
Hannetaire (Eugenie). Portrait of the actress as a young sultaness, after Le Gendre
Jordan (Jean-Louis), businessman. 1762
Lenoir, lieutenant de police. 1778. Bust 
Sartine (A.-R.-J.-G. de), comte d'Alby, lieutenant general de police

Histoire naturelle

Chevillet made the engravings for several volumes of Buffon's great Histoire naturelle:

Notes

Sources

1729 births
1802 deaths
French engravers
People from Frankfurt (Oder)